Cadbury is a British-based confectionery manufacturer. 

Cadbury may also refer to:

People
 Cadbury family, a prominent British family of industrialists descending from Richard Tapper Cadbury
 Henry Cadbury (1883–1974), American religious scholar
 Richard Tapper Cadbury (1768–1860)
 John Cadbury (1801–1889), family patriarch, founder of Cadbury plc
 Richard Cadbury (1835–1899), manufacturer and philanthropist
 George Cadbury (1839–1922), younger brother, developed the firm and perfected the recipe for Dairy Milk
 Egbert Cadbury (1893–1967), First World War flying ace and later managing director of the family firm
 Peter Cadbury (1918–2006), an entrepreneur who made his own career outside the family firm
 Adrian Cadbury (1929–2015), businessman and commentator on corporate governance
 Dominic Cadbury (born 1940), businessman and Chancellor of the University of Birmingham
 Ruth Cadbury (born 1959), English Labour Party politician

Places

England
 Cadbury Camp, North Somerset
 Cadbury Castle, Devon
 Cadbury Castle, Somerset
 Cadbury Hill, Somerset
 Cadbury, Devon
 North Cadbury, Somerset
 South Cadbury, Somerset

Other uses
 Cadbury Athletic F.C., an English football club
 Cadbury Report, a British report on corporate governance
 GWR 4073 Class 7028 Cadbury Castle, a Great Western Railway locomotive
 Cadbury, fictional character from the Richie Rich comics series

See also
 "Cadbury, The Beaver who Lacked", a short story by Philip K. Dick
 Cadbury Ireland, the company's Irish subsidiary